The 1979 NHL expansion was the culmination of several years of negotiations between the National Hockey League (NHL) and the World Hockey Association (WHA) that resulted in the WHA and its six surviving franchises folding in return for the owners of four of those teams (the Edmonton Oilers, New England Whalers, Quebec Nordiques, and Winnipeg Jets) being granted expansion franchises that commenced play in the NHL for the 1979–80 season. The agreement officially took effect on June 22, 1979. The agreement ended the seven-year existence of the WHA and re-established the NHL as the lone major league in North American professional ice hockey.

The two leagues had discussed the possibility of some sort of amalgamation for numerous years, despite the acrimonious relationship between the two after the WHA aggressively recruited NHL players upon the former's founding in 1971. The two sides came close to an agreement in 1977, but the proposed merger was defeated by a group of hard-line NHL owners. The NHL also initially rejected the 1979 expansion agreement by one vote. However, a massive boycott of Molson products in Canada led the Montreal Canadiens (who were owned at the time by the aforementioned brewery) to reverse their position. In a second vote, in which Vancouver Canucks also dropped their opposition, the agreement was ratified.

Although popularly called the NHL–WHA merger, the NHL refused to recognize the WHA's records or history as being any part of its own, and explicitly treated the WHA teams' enfranchising not as a merger but rather as an expansion consisting of four new teams which happened to have identical or similar names to some of the former WHA teams. Notably, and in stark contrast to amalgamations consummated within the preceding decade in American football and basketball, the existing NHL teams were given the right to reclaim players to which they held NHL "rights" from the WHA clubs without compensation, with the caveat that each of the new NHL franchises were permitted to retain two goaltenders and two skaters from their WHA rosters.

To fill the remainder of the "new" teams' NHL rosters, an expansion draft was held. The expansion teams were also placed at the end of the draft order for the 1979 NHL Entry Draft, as opposed to typical expansion teams in North American sports leagues which are usually placed at or very near the front of the draft order.

Background
Since the demise of the Western Canada Hockey League in 1926, the NHL had existed as the only major professional North American ice hockey league. After dwindling from ten teams to the so-called Original Six in 1942, the NHL stabilized. In the years following World War II, the league became immensely profitable. Similar to other professional leagues of the era, the NHL enforced a reserve clause to prevent players from signing with other NHL teams after their contracts expired.

Through to the end of the 1950s, the NHL refused to seriously consider expansion. However, following speculation that the Western Hockey League intended to declare itself a major league, the NHL was entertaining expansion discussions by 1963, culminating four years later with the addition of six new teams for the 1967–68 NHL season; this sparked the first significant expansion period for the league that continued until it had tripled in size to 18 teams in 1974.

The WHA was founded in 1971 with ten teams, and intended to operate as a direct competitor to the NHL. By its inaugural season, 67 NHL players had defected to the new league. Former Chicago Black Hawks star Bobby Hull lent immediate credibility to the fledgling circuit when he signed a 10-year contract with the Winnipeg Jets for $2.7 million, the largest in hockey history at the time. The NHL attempted in court to block the defections, earning an injunction against the Jets that initially prevented several players, including Hull, from playing in the WHA. The new league challenged the orders, stating that the NHL's reserve clause, which tied players' rights to their NHL team for life, was illegal. A Philadelphia district court sided with the WHA in November 1972, ruling that the reserve clause violated the Sherman Antitrust Act, freeing all players to play in the WHA. The ruling ended the NHL's monopoly on talent.

Since hockey salaries were among the lowest in professional sports at the time, a key part of the WHA's business plan was to place franchises in midsized Canadian 
markets, including the Edmonton Oilers, Winnipeg Jets, Ottawa Nationals and Quebec Nordiques who played in cities the NHL had repeatedly rejected for expansion franchises but which the WHA thought could sustain major professional hockey teams. The WHA also challenged the older league more directly by placing teams in NHL markets, including the Philadelphia Blazers (Philadelphia Flyers), who later became the Vancouver Blazers (Vancouver Canucks). The WHA also iced the New York Golden Blades (New York Rangers), Toronto Toros (Toronto Maple Leafs) and Chicago Cougars (Chicago Black Hawks), among others. The WHA's existence prompted the NHL to hastily expand to Atlanta and Long Island in 1972 to keep the rival loop out of the newly completed Omni Coliseum and Nassau Veterans Memorial Coliseum; the teams were christened as the Flames and New York Islanders, respectively.

Merger talks
Merger negotiations between the two leagues had been ongoing since shortly after it became clear within NHL circles the WHA would indeed play. In early 1973, NHL governors Bill Jennings of the New York Rangers and Ed Snider of the Philadelphia Flyers approached the WHA and offered to have all 12 of its franchises join the NHL for $4 million each. This overture went nowhere, particularly since in addition to the aforementioned franchise fees Jennings and Snider demanded exorbitant compensation for infringing on the "territory" of the Rangers and Flyers, based on the indemnity paid by the Islanders when they were granted an NHL franchise on Long Island. 

Attempts at reconciliation were frequently blocked by Toronto's Harold Ballard, Chicago's Bill Wirtz, and Boston's Paul A. Mooney, owners of the three NHL teams most affected by the WHA's player raids. By 1976, however, both leagues were struggling under the financial pressures of competing against each other on the ice and in the courtroom. Bobby Hull had become an outspoken proponent of a merger between the two leagues, though Gordie Howe (the NHL's all-time scoring leader-turned-WHA player) and WHA president Bill MacFarland disagreed, arguing that the WHA was sustainable indefinitely.

Long-time NHL President Clarence Campbell was fiercely opposed to any union between the two leagues, saying, "They're our rivals. They were people that did their best to destroy us. Why would we salvage them now? To hell with them." Despite this animosity, some NHL teams agreed to play preseason exhibition games against WHA opponents prior to the 1974–75 season. Campbell ordered this interleague play halted in 1975, but the following year, the NHL president (who by this time was facing both declining health and personal scandal) relented and interleague exhibition games resumed, although a few NHL clubs, including Montreal and Toronto, continued to boycott them.

Campbell retired in 1977, and his successor, John Ziegler (the NHL's first American chief executive), was more open to unification. Under Ziegler's presidency, interleague exhibition games became more common, eventually involving every NHL team except Los Angeles, Buffalo, Toronto, and Montreal. Merger negotiations also intensified, and continued to be conducted openly. The American teams were far less hostile to the idea of a merger than their Canadian counterparts. There were a number of reasons for this, but probably the most compelling was the Montreal Canadiens' dominance of the NHL during the years of the WHA's existence. The Canadiens won five Stanley Cups during this time, including four in a row from 1976 through 1979. The 1976–77 Canadiens in particular are widely considered to be the most dominant team in NHL history. Montreal owed this success in large part to its ability to better resist WHA efforts to lure away its players, a notable exception being J.C. Tremblay, who left the Canadiens to play for the WHA's Quebec Nordiques. While this may have been in part because Canadian Hockey Night in Canada television revenues were mostly distributed among the three Canadian teams instead of across the league, an additional factor was that star Quebecois players were long accustomed to playing in their home province, and even with the draft in effect these players (in particular, Guy Lafleur) successfully leveraged the threat of signing with the Nordiques to ensure the Canadiens were able to acquire their NHL rights. Hence, adding Canadian teams and in particular absorbing or eliminating the Nordiques had the potential of blunting that advantage. Also, both NHL and WHA owners realized that the Canadian markets were a vital economic base, both to the WHA and any future rival league that might take its place. Absorbing the Canadian markets would therefore preclude the possibility of the NHL having to fight off another rival league.

However, American support for a merger was based on the assumption that all existing NHL teams would share the expansion fees equally; this did not go over well with the league's Canadian owners. The objection was not without precedent; in 1970, Montreal and Toronto had only agreed to support Vancouver's addition to the NHL after they were paid indemnities for the inclusion of the Canucks in the Hockey Night in Canada television deal. Although the three Canadian teams could not block any agreement on their own, the fact that any deal needed three-quarters support among the NHL owners meant that the Canadian teams only needed two American clubs to side with them to block any agreement.

In June 1977, Ziegler announced that the NHL had created a committee to investigate the possibility of a merger, while Bill DeWitt, Jr., owner of the WHA's Cincinnati Stingers, stated that Ziegler had invited six WHA teams to join the NHL for the 1977–78 season if various conditions could be met. This proposal would have seen the six teams become full NHL members, but play in their own division with a separate schedule for the first year.

Led by Toronto's Harold Ballard, the owners voted down Ziegler's proposal. The Calgary Cowboys, who had hoped to be one of the six teams to join the NHL, subsequently folded, as did the Phoenix Roadrunners, Minnesota Fighting Saints, and San Diego Mariners. This reduced the WHA to eight teams for the 1977–78 WHA season, and left its long-term future in doubt.

1978 revised agreement

The intense competition between the leagues did not leave the NHL unscathed. The Pittsburgh Penguins filed for bankruptcy in 1975 and nearly moved to Seattle before they found stable ownership with shopping mall magnate Edward J. DeBartolo Sr., a native of nearby Youngstown, Ohio who decided to keep the team in Pittsburgh (DeBartolo would later go on to own the San Francisco 49ers of the NFL). The California Golden Seals and Kansas City Scouts were not as lucky, as both teams would move for 1976, with the Golden Seals becoming the Cleveland Barons and the Scouts the Colorado Rockies after only two years in Kansas City. By 1978 the NHL faced the possibility of two of its teams (the Minnesota North Stars and Barons) folding. Ziegler was able to mitigate the damage by arranging a merger between the two clubs; the Barons remain the most recent example of an American professional sports team in an established major league ceasing operations.

Negotiations resumed in 1978, and it again appeared that the Houston Aeros, as one of the league's strongest teams, were an obvious candidate to join the NHL. Unfortunately for Houston, by this time Ziegler realized NHL owners would never vote to admit six teams, and floated a proposal that would admit four WHA franchises. The WHA responded by insisting that all three of its Canadian teams be admitted to the NHL. This left room for only one American team, with the only serious contenders for that spot being the Aeros and Whalers. Aeros owner Kenneth Schnitzer attempted to persuade Boston Bruins owner Jeremy Jacobs to support the agreement that included the Aeros and not the Bruins' neighbors based in Hartford, only to find that Jacobs, as one of the older league's most hard-line owners, was opposed to any sort of merger with the WHA and that Ziegler was cool to the idea of adding another Sun Belt NHL team. Of the three Sun Belt teams that had joined the league since 1967, one (the Golden Seals) had already relocated and two (the Los Angeles Kings and Atlanta Flames) were struggling financially.

During the final series of talks, it soon became evident that no merger of any sort would take place in time for the 1978–79 NHL season. It was also apparent that when there was a merger, the Aeros were not likely to be included. Schnitzer announced that the Aeros would not take part in the 1978–79 WHA season, bringing the league down to seven teams. He first applied for direct admission to the NHL, only to find the older league uninterested in such an expansion with so many of its existing franchises struggling. Finally, Schnitzer campaigned to be allowed to purchase an existing club and relocate it to Houston. The obvious candidate to move was the Barons (the former Golden Seals), who were on the verge of folding. Schnitzer believed the older league would accept almost any other proposal as an alternative to the perceived embarrassment of having to disband a franchise, and did come close to a deal to relocate the moribund Barons franchise to Houston. However, the NHL instead opted to approve a proposal from George and Gordon Gund (the owners of the Barons) to buy the North Stars franchise and "merge" it with their own. Having run out of options, Schnitzer folded the Aeros on July 9, 1978. In doing so, the Aeros became the only WHA playoff champion that did not eventually join the NHL.

Discussion between the two leagues intensified into the 1978–79 season, when the WHA made an offer to have five teams join the NHL the following year, paying $5 million each for the right to join. Although the WHA offer was not accepted, Ziegler was encouraged, stating that owners were beginning to view the negotiations from a business standpoint rather than an emotional one. The WHA saw the Indianapolis Racers fold after only 25 games, reducing the league further to six teams, the lowest in league history.

Final agreement
Six teams was widely seen as the absolute minimum to maintain a viable and credible league, and with the WHA facing financial difficulty and struggling to meet payrolls, the Racers' demise left the floundering league's players and fans in doubt as to whether the league would even finish the season. However, the Racers left the league with a key piece of leverage when flamboyant owner Nelson Skalbania signed 17-year-old superstar Wayne Gretzky to a lucrative personal services contract. At the time, the NHL did not permit the signing of players under 20, nor did it allow its owners to sign players to anything except standard NHL contracts, but the WHA had no rules barring such signings. Skalbania signed Gretzky to a personal services contract so that he would retain the rights to the teenaged superstar even if the WHA folded outright. He knew the Racers would not be part of any merger, but hoped to keep them alive long enough to reap a major windfall from selling the highly touted Gretzky's rights. He also hoped to get compensation from the teams included in the merger.

Gretzky only played eight games for the Racers. Skalbania ultimately could not meet his obligations (thus leading to his team's demise) and opted to sell Gretzky's contract to Oilers owner Peter Pocklington. Unlike Skalbania, Pocklington was better financed at the time and owned a team that was much better supported and thus reasonably stable by WHA standards, and were all but certain to be part of a merger deal.

The two leagues reached an agreement in March 1979 to grant expansion franchises in four WHA cities, pending ratification by the NHL's owners. The NHL originally wanted to take in the New England Whalers, Winnipeg Jets, and Edmonton Oilers. The owners of the Cincinnati Stingers and Birmingham Bulls were resigned to their exclusion from the NHL, but the Quebec Nordiques fought the proposal. The NHL's American teams were less enthusiastic about including Quebec than they were about Edmonton and Winnipeg, and Ziegler thought that the Canadiens might be persuaded to support an agreement that excluded the Nordiques.

Nevertheless, the WHA insisted on NHL franchises for all three of its surviving Canadian markets and Ziegler finally agreed to put the matter to a vote of the NHL's Board of Governors. At a March 8, 1979 meeting in Key Largo, Florida, 12 of the 17 owners supported the proposal – one short of the required three-fourths majority (13 teams out of 17 would have represented 76.5% of the league, just past the threshold stipulated in the NHL constitution to grant expansion franchises. As the initial vote stood, it only represented 70.6%). The five teams that voted against the agreement were the Canadiens, Vancouver Canucks, Boston Bruins, Toronto Maple Leafs, and Los Angeles Kings.

The five teams that cast a "no" ballot did so for different reasons. The Bruins were not pleased with the prospect of sharing New England with the Whalers, while the Canadiens were even less enamored with having to share the province of Quebec with the Nordiques. The Canadiens, Canucks, and Maple Leafs disliked the idea of having to split Hockey Night in Canada revenues six ways rather than three, while the Canucks and Kings feared the loss of dates with NHL teams from the east. Maple Leafs' owner Ballard had a personal grudge as well; he had never forgiven the WHA for plundering his roster in the early 1970s.

The Canadiens were owned by Molson Brewery, and when news emerged that the Canadiens had voted against the deal, fans in Edmonton, Winnipeg, and Quebec City organized a boycott of Molson products, believing that Molson was standing in the way of their cities remaining big-league hockey towns. The boycott quickly spread nationwide. It caused a drain on the Canucks' revenue as well, since Pacific Coliseum sold Molson products. The House of Commons of Canada weighed in as well, unanimously passing a motion urging the NHL to reconsider. A second vote was held in Chicago on March 22, 1979, which passed by a 14–3 margin as both Montreal and Vancouver reversed their positions. Both teams' hands were forced by the boycott, and the Canucks were also won over by the promise of a balanced schedule, with each team playing the others twice at home and twice on the road.

The agreement resulted in the Oilers, Whalers, Nordiques, and Jets joining the NHL for the 1979–80 NHL season, increasing the league's membership to 21 teams. However, the NHL insisted on treating the WHA teams' arrival as an expansion, not a merger. The WHA teams each had to pay a $6 million franchise fee for the right to enter the NHL – however, since this was nominally the same fee paid by all of the other teams that joined the NHL in the 1970s (a decade of high inflation), the financial terms of the agreement were nominally quite favorable to the WHA although some of the teams that joined earlier in the decade received concessions on their fees.  The two remaining WHA teams, the Stingers and Bulls, were paid $1.5 million apiece in parachute payments and joined the Central Hockey League, the league-owned minor league, for one season each. The Stingers folded after 33 games; the Bulls played two full seasons before folding. Major pro hockey has yet to return to Cincinnati or Birmingham, though the NHL did place teams in the nearby markets of Columbus and Nashville in the late 1990s.

The rest of the agreement was slanted heavily in the NHL's favour. The NHL held a reclamation draft for the established clubs, in which nearly all of the players who had bolted from the NHL and were still active in the WHA saw their rights revert to their NHL clubs without compensation. The WHA clubs were thus stripped of nearly all of their players; for all intents and purposes, they were effectively dissolved and had to rebuild their rosters from scratch. However, in one of the few concessions to the WHA teams, they were allowed to protect two goalies and two skaters. Some less formal exceptions were also made, in particular for aging players: hockey legends Gordie Howe and Dave Keon of the Whalers were allowed to remain with the Whalers rather than report to the Red Wings and Maple Leafs respectively while Bobby Hull was allowed to remain with the Jets rather than report to the Black Hawks - Hull would later be traded from the Jets to the Whalers and play on the same line as Howe and Keon during the 1979–80 season.

Even more controversial was the NHL's insistence that the four new teams be placed at the bottom of the order for the 1979 NHL Entry Draft. Historically, the NHL slots expansion teams at or near the top in an entry draft. In what was not a complete coincidence, the NHL also lowered the draft age to nineteen, effectively doubling the size and depth of the talent pool in the 1979 draft. Ostensibly, this was done in exchange for the Oilers being allowed to retain Gretzky as a priority selection, which unexpectedly became an issue after Gretzky made it clear he was not interested in voiding his personal services contract only to return the junior ranks or join the floundering Colorado Rockies (who would have presumably drafted Gretzky with the first overall pick had they been given the opportunity). Gretzky was still only eighteen years old at the time but was allowed to join the NHL with the Oilers on account of his professional experience. As a player joining from another professional league, Gretzky was deemed ineligible for the league's Calder Memorial Trophy awarded each year to the league's top rookie.

The former WHA teams were restocked via the 1979 NHL Expansion Draft with the established NHL teams receiving $125,000 per player taken in that draft. However, this compensation formed part of the former WHA teams' $6 million franchise fees. Additionally, a good number of players on the list were either retired or of little value; years later Oilers general manager/coach Glen Sather said that the WHA teams knew this, but went along only because they had to participate.

As the league considered the agreement to be an expansion as opposed to a merger, it refused to recognize WHA records. The four new NHL franchises were regarded as new entities, not as continuations of the former WHA franchises. The Canadian teams were permitted to operate under their established names, colors, logos and front office personnel, however, to appease and satisfy the Bruins, the NHL insisted that the Whalers drop "New England" from their name and they entered the league as the "Hartford Whalers" instead. The NHL continues to recognize all four franchises as having been founded on June 22, 1979, which is also the date the WHA and its six remaining teams are reckoned to have formally ceased to exist.

Aftermath
The NHL had originally intended to place its four newest franchises in each of its four divisions (then called the Adams, Norris, Patrick and Smythe), but the Oilers and Jets lobbied to be placed in the same division as the Canucks. The league agreed, although its decision to play a balanced league-wide schedule rendered the divisional alignment irrelevant for the next two seasons. Nevertheless, the divisions were formally retained.

Although the WHA clubs had performed quite well against their NHL rivals in inter-league exhibition games (of 63 such games played, the WHA won 34, lost 22 and tied 7) as expansion teams were nevertheless expected to struggle on the ice after joining the NHL due to the purging of their rosters. However, the NHL also expanded the Stanley Cup playoffs from 12 teams to 16. This allowed the Whalers and Oilers to qualify for the playoffs in their respective first NHL seasons although both teams were swept in the first round. The following year, the Oilers stunned NHL loyalists when they swept the heavily favoured Canadiens in the first round.

The addition of three new NHL teams in Canada led the league to reconsider other Canadian cities it had previously rejected placing franchises in. One year after the 1979 expansion, the Atlanta Flames relocated to Calgary, becoming archrivals of the Oilers in the process.

The final chapter of the 1979 expansion arguably took place in 1983 when Bill Hunter (the original owner of the WHA Oilers) reached an agreement with St. Louis Blues owners Ralston Purina to purchase the Blues and relocate the team to his hometown of Saskatoon, Saskatchewan. Despite obtaining more than 18,000 commitments for season tickets, this bid met with universal hostility from NHL owners. Although Hunter insisted such a franchise would be viable on the basis of being supported by the whole province (similar to the Saskatchewan Roughriders football team) Saskatoon itself was only a fraction of the size of any other NHL city. The owners of the Oilers, Flames and Jets were particularly opposed since Saskatchewan had become an important secondary market for all of them in terms of television revenues, merchandise sales and even gate receipts, although they were more reluctant than other owners to say so publicly so as not to alienate those same fans. The Nordiques were still owned by Carling O'Keefe (which at the time owned a brewery in Saskatoon) and also kept silent to avoid triggering a 1979-like boycott. As this was occurring, the final installments of the 1979 expansion fees were coming due. To minimize public support for the bid, Ziegler arranged to defer receipt of the fees from the Canadian teams until after the Board of Governors vote, ostensibly making the Oilers, Jets and Nordiques "ineligible" to vote on Hunter's bid so that they did not have to make their position officially known on a bid they privately opposed. The Canadiens, seeing no point in provoking another boycott by opposing a doomed bid, voted in favour, as did the Flames for a total of three votes in favour (including the Blues) against 15 opposed (including the Whalers). Eventually, a bidder willing to keep the team in St. Louis and save them from contraction took over the team.

In 1992, the NHL added an expansion franchise in Ottawa. However, the league rejected a bid to expand to Hamilton. A bid from Saskatoon during this round of expansion was withdrawn before the final decision was made.

Legacy
In its seven seasons, the WHA paid its players $120 million, and lost over $50 million. The competition for talent introduced by the WHA, and accelerated by the signing of Bobby Hull, led to a rapid escalation of salaries for players in both leagues. For the first time, hockey players had meaningful leverage in contract negotiations.

In its search for talent, the WHA turned to the previously overlooked European market, signing players from Finland and Sweden. Anders Hedberg, Lars-Erik Sjöberg, and Ulf Nilsson signed with the Jets in 1974 and thrived in North America, both in the WHA and later the NHL. The Jets won three of the six remaining WHA playoff championships after signing European players, and their success sparked similar signings league-wide. Many of these players went on to NHL careers.

Of the teams that joined the NHL in 1979, only the Edmonton Oilers remain in their original city today. The other three franchises all moved and acquired new names within a three-year period in the 1990s: the Nordiques became the Colorado Avalanche in 1995, and won the Stanley Cup in their first season in Denver. The Jets became the Phoenix Coyotes in 1996, a move which remains the only occasion since 1979 the NHL has placed a team in a formerly active WHA city that did not previously host an NHL team. The Whalers (renamed the Hartford Whalers upon admission to the NHL in 1979) became the Carolina Hurricanes in 1997. The Oilers nearly followed the other three teams south the following year after financially strapped owner Peter Pocklington received an offer from a buyer in Houston - itself not only a former WHA city, but one which unlike the previous three relocations was widely expected to keep the team's established nickname due to its prospective new city's well-established history of using it. However, a local ownership group was able to assemble the financing needed to keep the team in Edmonton. The Oilers were eventually acquired by Edmonton-based billionaire Daryl Katz, who became sole owner of the franchise in 2008. In 2016, the Oilers opened their new arena, Rogers Place, replacing Northlands Coliseum, which had been their home since 1974.

Of the three cities to have lost their WHA/NHL teams, only Winnipeg has received one back when the Atlanta Thrashers relocated there in 2011. The Oilers are the only WHA team to win the Stanley Cup while in their WHA city, which they have done on five occasions (1984, 1985, 1987, 1988, and 1990). The Avalanche won the Stanley Cup in 1996, their first season after leaving Quebec City, and have since won Cups in 2001 and 2022. The Hurricanes won their only Stanley Cup in 2006, their ninth season after leaving Hartford. The Jets/Coyotes franchise has never appeared in the Stanley Cup Finals, and has advanced to the second playoff round only three times (1985, 1987, 2012) and the conference final once (2012).

Notwithstanding the NHL's non-recognition of WHA records, all four surviving WHA teams subsequently retired at least one jersey number in recognition of on-ice endeavors achieved exclusively or primarily in the WHA. The three teams that re-located in the 1990s took different approaches with respect to the retired numbers - both Colorado and Carolina disclaimed their teams' pre-relocation histories in both the WHA and NHL and re-entered all previously retired numbers into circulation, regardless of league (although notably, the Hurricanes have never issued the #9 worn by Gordie Howe and retired by the Whalers). The Coyotes previously decided to hang all previously retired Jets' numbers in the rafters including, notably, the #9 of Bobby Hull notwithstanding the fact Hull only played 18 games for the Jets in their first NHL season (the last of his career). In doing so, the Coyotes implicitly recognized the Winnipeg Jets' entire history from 1972 to 1996 as their own. The Coyotes later temporarily un-retired #9 so Hull's son Brett could wear it for the final five games of his NHL career. By the time the NHL returned to Winnipeg, the league had taken over the Coyotes following bankruptcy and had even entertained an offer from the eventual Thrashers' purchasers to return the Coyotes to Manitoba. The league therefore had to decide whether to allow the former Thrashers to reclaim the Jets' name and history. In the end, the NHL decided to allow Winnipeg to reclaim its former name, but not its pre-1996 history. The pre-1996 Jets history therefore remained with the Arizona franchise while the Winnipeg franchise retained the Thrashers' history; aside from Gretzky's number 99 that was retired league-wide in 2000, the Thrashers did not officially retire any numbers while in Atlanta, though they did remove #37 from circulation following the death of Dan Snyder. (The number, with Snyder's family's blessing, returned to circulation in 2016 with Connor Hellebuyck currently wearing the number.) The "new" Jets immediately and controversially recognized the league's decision by issuing #9 to Evander Kane, who had worn the same number with the Thrashers. In 2014, after the Coyotes changed their geographical identifier from Phoenix to Arizona, they returned all of the numbers retired from the original Jets era to circulation, reclassifying them as "honoured numbers" on the Arizona Coyotes Ring of Honor. As for the modern-day Jets, they likewise honoured players from the original Jets via the Winnipeg Jets Hall of Fame, despite the latter's history belonging to the Coyotes.

See also
History of the National Hockey League
History of the National Hockey League (1967–1992)
History of organizational changes in the NHL
ABA–NBA merger
AFL–NFL merger

References

Further reading

External links
Troubled WHA folds and its teams join the NHL at the CBC Digital Archives

Merger
National Hockey League history
World Hockey Association
History of the Edmonton Oilers
Hartford Whalers
Quebec Nordiques
History of the Winnipeg Jets
National Hockey League expansion
Sports-related mergers
Winnipeg Jets (1972–1996)
June 1979 sports events in North America